Aphiwe Odwa Dyantyi (born ) is a South African professional rugby union player who currently plays for the South Africa national team, the  in Super Rugby, the  in the Currie Cup and the  in the Rugby Challenge.  He is currently suspended from all rugby pending alleged doping allegations, which also ruled him out of participating in South Africa's successful 2019 rugby world cup campaign. His regular position is wing or centre.

Rugby career

Schools rugby (2007–2012)

However, he missed out on provincial selection at high school level and did not even play for the Dale College Boys' High School first XV after being deemed too small.

University and youth rugby (2013–2015)

After school, Dyantyi enrolled at the University of Johannesburg to study a B.Com. in marketing and he mainly played soccer, but returned to rugby after friends invited him to play in UJ's internal  (residency) league. He represented UJ in the Young Guns competition in 2014, as well as playing some rugby sevens for the university.

Golden Lions and UJ (2016–2017)

In addition to making his Currie Cup debut, Dyantyi also scored his first Currie Cup try in a 36–43 defeat. He remained in the squad for the remainder of the competition, eventually featuring in all 13 of his side's matches, scoring further tries in their return match against the Blue Bulls and their penultimate match of the regular season against  to help the Golden Lions finish in third spot and secure a semifinal berth. The team fell short at that stage, losing 5–19 to Western Province in Cape Town.

Super Rugby and South Africa (2018)

In 2018, Dyantyi was named in the  squad for the 2018 Super Rugby season. A torn pectoral muscle ruled him out for six weeks, but he returned for four matches before the break for the June internationals, including a match against the  where he played in an unfamiliar outside centre role.

South Africa head coach Rassie Erasmus included Dyantyi in the national squad for the incoming series against England and he started and scored a try in their 42–39 victory in the first test. He also started their second and third test matches, helping South Africa to a 2–1 win in the series.

Dyantyi's try haul of seven tries was the joint-second most by a Lions player'; replacement winger Madosh Tambwe also scored seven while hooker Malcolm Marx topped the try-scoring charts with 12 tries.

He also scored a try in their next match — a 23-12 win against Australia — after just 25 seconds.

Honours and awards

On 25 November 2018 at the World Rugby Awards in Monaco, Dyantyi was named the World Rugby Breakthrough Player of the Year, after a season that saw him score six tries in thirteen appearances for the South Africa national team. He is the fourth winner of this award and the first South African.

Doping allegations

In July 2019, Dyantyi tested positively for metandienone, methyltestosterone and LGD-4033, which are all on the World Anti-Doping Agency's banned substances list. He was informed about the doping violation in August 2019, and the South African Institute for Drug-Free Sports charged Dyantyi with doping offences after his 'B' sample also tested positive.

International appearances

Dyantyi appeared in the following matches for South Africa:

References

External links
 
 itsrugby.co.uk profile

South African rugby union players
Living people
1994 births
People from Engcobo Local Municipality
Rugby union wings
Golden Lions players
Lions (United Rugby Championship) players
South Africa international rugby union players
Rugby union players from the Eastern Cape